Filippo Luigi Penati (30 December 1952 – 9 October 2019) was an Italian politician. Born in Monza, He was mayor of Sesto San Giovanni between 1994 and 2001, and president of the Province of Milan between 2004 and 2009. He died in Sesto San Giovanni, aged 66.

References

External links 

1952 births
2019 deaths
Mayors of places in Lombardy
People from Monza
Presidents of the Province of Milan
21st-century Italian politicians
20th-century Italian politicians